In mathematics, the pigeonhole principle states that if  items are put into  containers, with , then at least one container must contain more than one item. For example, if one has three gloves (and none is ambidextrous/reversible), then there must be at least two right-handed gloves, or at least two left-handed gloves, because there are three objects, but only two categories of handedness to put them into. This seemingly obvious statement, a type of counting argument, can be used to demonstrate possibly unexpected results. For example, given that the population of London is greater than the maximum number of hairs that can be present on a human's head, then the pigeonhole principle requires that there must be at least two people in London who have the same number of hairs on their heads.

Although the pigeonhole principle appears as early as 1624 in a book attributed to Jean Leurechon, it is commonly called Dirichlet's box principle or Dirichlet's drawer principle after an 1834 treatment of the principle by Peter Gustav Lejeune Dirichlet under the name  ("drawer principle" or "shelf principle").

The principle has several generalizations and can be stated in various ways.

Though the most straightforward application is to finite sets (such as pigeons and boxes), it is also used with infinite sets that cannot be put into one-to-one correspondence.  To do so requires the formal statement of the pigeonhole principle, which is "there does not exist an injective function whose codomain is smaller than its domain".  Advanced mathematical proofs like Siegel's lemma build upon this more general concept.

Etymology

Dirichlet published his works in both French and German, using either the German  or the French . The strict original meaning of these terms corresponds to the English drawer, that is, an open-topped box that can be slid in and out of the cabinet that contains it. (Dirichlet wrote about distributing pearls among drawers.) These terms were morphed to the word pigeonhole in the sense of a small open space in a desk, cabinet, or wall for keeping letters or papers, metaphorically rooted in structures that house pigeons.

Because furniture with pigeonholes is commonly used for storing or sorting things into many categories (such as letters in a post office or room keys in a hotel), the translation pigeonhole may be a better rendering of Dirichlet's original drawer metaphor. That understanding of the term pigeonhole, referring to some furniture features, is fading—especially among those who do not speak English natively but as a lingua franca in the scientific world—in favour of the more pictorial interpretation, literally involving pigeons and holes. The suggestive (though not misleading) interpretation of "pigeonhole" as "dovecote" has lately found its way back to a German back-translation of the "pigeonhole principle" as the "".

Besides the original terms "" in German and "" in French, other literal translations are still in use in Arabic, Bulgarian (""), Chinese (""), Danish (""), Dutch (""), Hungarian (""), Italian (""), Japanese (""), Persian (""), Polish (""), Portuguese (""), Swedish (""), Turkish ("") and Vietnamese ("").

Examples

Sock picking 
Assume a drawer contains a mixture of black socks and blue socks, each of which can be worn on either foot, and that you are pulling a number of socks from the drawer without looking. What is the minimum number of pulled socks required to guarantee a pair of the same color? Using the pigeonhole principle  socks, using one pigeonhole per color), you need to pull only three socks from the drawer  items). Either you have three of one color, or you have two of one color and one of the other.

Hand shaking 
If there are  people who can shake hands with one another (where ), the pigeonhole principle shows that there is always a pair of people who will shake hands with the same number of people. In this application of the principle, the 'hole' to which a person is assigned is the number of hands shaken by that person. On the other hand, either the '0' hole or the  hole or both must be empty, for it is impossible (if ) for some person to shake hands with everybody else while some person shakes hands with nobody. This leaves  people to be placed into at most  non-empty holes, so that the principle applies.

This hand-shaking example is equivalent to the statement that in any graph with more than one vertex, there is at least one pair of vertices that share the same degree. This can be seen by associating each person with a vertex and each edge with a handshake.

Hair counting 
One can demonstrate there must be at least two people in London with the same number of hairs on their heads as follows. Since a typical human head has an average of around 150,000 hairs, it is reasonable to assume (as an upper bound) that no one has more than 1,000,000 hairs on their head  holes). There are more than 1,000,000 people in London ( is bigger than 1 million items). Assigning a pigeonhole to each number of hairs on a person's head, and assigning people to pigeonholes according to the number of hairs on their head, there must be at least two people assigned to the same pigeonhole by the 1,000,001st assignment (because they have the same number of hairs on their heads) (or). Assuming London has 9.002 million people, one can even state that at least ten Londoners have the same number of hairs, as having nine Londoners in each of the 1 million pigeonholes accounts for only 9 million people.

For the average case with the constraint: fewest overlaps, there will be at most one person assigned to every pigeonhole and the 150,001st person assigned to the same pigeonhole as someone else. In the absence of this constraint, there may be empty pigeonholes because the "collision" happens before the 150,001st person. The principle just proves the existence of an overlap; it says nothing of the number of overlaps (which falls under the subject of probability distribution).

There is a passing, satirical, allusion in English to this version of the principle in A History of the Athenian Society, prefixed to "A Supplement to the Athenian Oracle: Being a Collection of the
Remaining Questions and Answers in the Old Athenian Mercuries", (Printed for Andrew Bell, London, 1710). It seems that the question whether there were any two persons in the World that have an equal number of hairs on their head? had been raised in The Athenian Mercury before 1704.

Perhaps the first written reference to the pigeonhole principle appears in 1622 in a short sentence of the Latin work Selectæ Propositiones, by the French Jesuit Jean Leurechon, where he wrote "It is necessary that two men have the same number of hairs, écus, or other things, as each other." The full principle was spelled out two years later, with additional examples, in another book that has often been attributed to Leurechon, but may have been written by one of his students.

The birthday problem 
The birthday problem asks, for a set of  randomly chosen people, what is the probability that some pair of them will have the same birthday? The problem itself is mainly concerned with counterintuitive probabilities; however, we can also tell by the pigeonhole principle that, if there are 367 people in the room, there is at least one pair of people who share the same birthday with 100% probability, as there are only 366 possible birthdays to choose from (including February 29, if present).

Team tournament 
Imagine seven people who want to play in a tournament of teams  items), with a limitation of only four teams  holes) to choose from. The pigeonhole principle tells us that they cannot all play for different teams; there must be at least one team featuring at least two of the seven players:

Subset sum
Any subset of size six from the set  = {1,2,3,...,9} must contain two elements whose sum is 10. The pigeonholes will be labelled by the two element subsets {1,9}, {2,8}, {3,7}, {4,6} and the singleton {5}, five pigeonholes in all. When the six "pigeons" (elements of the size six subset) are placed into these pigeonholes, each pigeon going into the pigeonhole that has it contained in its label, at least one of the pigeonholes labelled with a two-element subset will have two pigeons in it.

Uses and applications 
The principle can be used to prove that any lossless compression algorithm, provided it makes some inputs smaller (as the name compression suggests), will also make some other inputs larger. Otherwise, the set of all input sequences up to a given length  could be mapped to the (much) smaller set of all sequences of length less than  without collisions (because the compression is lossless), a possibility which the pigeonhole principle excludes.

A notable problem in mathematical analysis is, for a fixed irrational number , to show that the set {[ is an integer} of fractional parts is dense in [0, 1]. This shows that 0 is a limit point of {[]}. Otherwise ], and by setting }, one obtains .

Variants occur in a number of proofs. In the proof of the pumping lemma for regular languages, a version that mixes finite and infinite sets is used: If infinitely many objects are placed into finitely many boxes, then there exist two objects that share a box.
In Fisk's solution of the Art gallery problem a sort of converse is used: If n objects are placed into k boxes, then there is a box containing at most n/k objects.

Alternative formulations 
The following are alternative formulations of the pigeonhole principle.

If  objects are distributed over  places, and if , then some place receives at least two objects.
(equivalent formulation of 1)  If  objects are distributed over  places in such a way that no place receives more than one object, then each place receives exactly one object.
If  objects are distributed over  places, and if , then some place receives no object.
(equivalent formulation of 3)  If  objects are distributed over  places in such a way that no place receives no object, then each place receives exactly one object.

Strong form
Let  be positive integers. If

objects are distributed into  boxes, then either the first box contains at least  objects, or the second box contains at least  objects, ..., or the th box contains at least  objects.

The simple form is obtained from this by taking , which gives  objects. Taking  gives the more quantified version of the principle, namely:

Let  and  be positive integers. If  objects are distributed into  boxes, then at least one of the boxes contains  or more of the objects.

Generalizations of the pigeonhole principle 

A probabilistic generalization of the pigeonhole principle states that if  pigeons are randomly put into  pigeonholes with uniform probability , then at least one pigeonhole will hold more than one pigeon with probability

where  is the falling factorial . For  (more pigeons than pigeonholes) it is one, in which case it coincides with the ordinary pigeonhole principle. But even if the number of pigeons does not exceed the number of pigeonholes, due to the random nature of the assignment of pigeons to pigeonholes there is often a substantial chance that clashes will occur. For example, if 2 pigeons are randomly assigned to 4 pigeonholes, there is a 25% chance that at least one pigeonhole will hold more than one pigeon; for 5 pigeons and 10 holes, that probability is 69.76%; and for 10 pigeons and 20 holes it is about 93.45%. If the number of holes stays fixed, there is always a greater probability of a pair when you add more pigeons. This problem is treated at much greater length in the birthday paradox.

To see that this implies the standard pigeonhole principle, take any fixed arrangement of  pigeons into  holes and let  be the number of pigeons in a hole chosen uniformly at random. Therefore,  is sometimes at least 2.

Infinite sets 
However, adding at least one element to a finite set is sufficient to ensure that the cardinality increases.

Another way to phrase the pigeonhole principle for finite sets is similar to the principle that finite sets are Dedekind finite: Let  and  be finite sets. This is not true for infinite sets: Consider the function on the natural numbers that sends 1 and 2 to 1, 3 and 4 to 2, 5 and 6 to 3, and so on.

There is a similar principle for infinite sets: If uncountably many pigeons are stuffed into countably many pigeonholes, there will exist at least one pigeonhole having uncountably many pigeons stuffed into it.

This principle is not a generalization of the pigeonhole principle for finite sets however: It is in general false for finite sets. This is a quite different statement, and is absurd for large finite cardinalities.

Quantum mechanics
Yakir Aharonov et al. have presented arguments that the pigeonhole principle may be violated in quantum mechanics, and proposed interferometric experiments to test the pigeonhole principle in quantum mechanics. However, later research has called this conclusion into question. In a January 2015 arXiv preprint, researchers Alastair Rae and Ted Forgan at the University of Birmingham performed a theoretical wave function analysis, employing the standard pigeonhole principle, on the flight of electrons at various energies through an interferometer. If the electrons had no interaction strength at all, they would each produce a single, perfectly circular peak. At high interaction strength, each electron produces four distinct peaks for a total of 12 peaks on the detector; these peaks are the result of the four possible interactions each electron could experience (alone, together with the first other particle only, together with the second other particle only, or all three together). If the interaction strength was fairly low, as would be the case in many real experiments, the deviation from a zero-interaction pattern would be nearly indiscernible, much smaller than the lattice spacing of atoms in solids, such as the detectors used for observing these patterns. This would make it very difficult or even impossible to distinguish a weak-but-nonzero interaction strength from no interaction whatsoever, and thus give an illusion of three electrons that did not interact despite all three passing through two paths.

See also 
 Axiom of choice
 Blichfeldt's theorem
 Combinatorial principles
 Combinatorial proof
 Dedekind-infinite set
 Dirichlet's approximation theorem
 Hilbert's paradox of the Grand Hotel
 Multinomial theorem
 Pochhammer symbol
 Ramsey's theorem

Notes

References

External links 

 
 "The strange case of The Pigeon-hole Principle"; Edsger Dijkstra investigates interpretations and reformulations of the principle.
 "The Pigeon Hole Principle"; Elementary examples of the principle in use by Larry Cusick.
 "Pigeonhole Principle from Interactive Mathematics Miscellany and Puzzles"; basic Pigeonhole Principle analysis and examples by Alexander Bogomolny.
 "16 fun applications of the pigeonhole principle"; Interesting facts derived by the principle.
 

Combinatorics
Theorems in discrete mathematics
Mathematical principles
Ramsey theory